"Break It Off" (also stylized in sentence case) is a song by English singer-songwriter PinkPantheress. It was officially released on 4 June 2021 through Elektra and Parlophone Records, as the lead single from her debut mixtape To Hell with It. An uptempo drum and bass and experimental pop song about heartbreak, it was written and produced by PinkPantheress and Adam F, and samples F's song "Circles". A snippet of the song went viral on TikTok, and it subsequently peaked at number 74 on the UK Singles Chart and at number 30 on the Billboard Hot Rock & Alternative Songs chart. A visualizer for the song was directed by Malt Disney and released on 21 June 2021.

Background and composition
"Break It Off" is an uptempo, "heartbreak-infused" drum and bass and experimental pop song with "sugary" vocals from PinkPantheress, who wrote and produced the song PinkPantheress while she was at university, which samples the drum and bass song "Circles" by English DJ Adam F. DIYs Chris Taylor described it as "a tale of late-night yearning", and Steffanee Wang of Nylon called it "a dizzying mix of breakbeats and edgy pop elements". After PinkPantheress posted a clip of the song to TikTok in March, it went viral and was used in over 500,000 videos on the platform.

Reception and commercial performance
David Renshaw of The Fader called "Break It Off" "an algorithm-breaking bolt from the blue, destined to be played on repeat throughout the summer months". Douglas Greenwood of i-D called the song an "earworm" while Complexs Seamus Fay described it as a "fast-paced, oddball single". Stereogums Chris DeVille described the song as a "playfully flirtatious melodic flutter", with Steffanee Wang of Nylon stated that it was "a great primer for the unpinnable vibe of [PinkPantheress's] vibe: simultaneously new and nostalgic." Jon Caramanica of The New York Times called the song "elegant in [its] own right" and wrote that it "encapsulate[s] the enthusiasm and thrill of listening to someone else's elegant song, one that rousts you from your shell and thrusts you into your own joy or sadness".

"Break It Off" peaked at number 74 on the UK Singles Chart and at number 30 on Billboards Hot Rock & Alternative Songs chart.

Music video
A visualizer for "Break It Off", directed by Malt Disney, was released on 21 June 2021. The video uses footage of demolition, car crashes, and memes with "abstract" animations superimposed over it. PinkPantheress called the visualizer a "doozy".

Credits and personnel
Credits adapted from AllMusic.
PinkPantheressvocals, songwriting, production, programming, mastering
Adam Fsongwriting, production, programming, engineering, mixing
Stuart Hawkesmastering

Charts

Weekly charts

Year-end charts

Certifications

References

2021 singles
2021 songs
PinkPantheress songs
Experimental pop songs
Parlophone singles
Elektra Records singles